The following tables show results for the Australian House of Representatives at the 1990 federal election held on 24 March 1990.

Australia

States

New South Wales

Victoria

Queensland

Western Australia

South Australia

Tasmania

Territories

Australian Capital Territory

Northern Territory

See also
 Results of the 1990 Australian federal election (Senate)
 Members of the Australian House of Representatives, 1990–1993

Notes

References

House of Representatives 1990
Australian House of Representatives
1990 elections in Australia